Femke Bol (born 23 February 2000) is a Dutch track and field athlete who specialises in the 400 metres hurdles and 400 metres. She is the 2020 Tokyo Olympics bronze medallist in the 400 m hurdles with the current European record of 52.03 seconds, becoming the third-fastest woman of all time and the first Dutch Olympic medallist at the event. Bol is also the 2022 World Championships silver medallist and 2022 European champion. In the 400 m, she is the 2022 World Indoor silver medallist, the 2022 European champion, a two-time European Indoor champion from 2021 and 2023, and the world indoor record holder with a time of 49.26 seconds set on 19 February 2023 in Apeldoorn, beating the longest-standing at the time (and contested) track world record. At all these events except the Tokyo Games, she also won medals in the 4 x 400 m relays, either women's or mixed.

Bol was the first female athlete to complete the 400 m/400 m hurdles double at a major championships after she won both titles at the 2022 European Championships, where she added third gold for the women's 4 x 400 m relay.

She was in her specialist hurdles event 2019 European under-20 champion. She holds world bests in the 300 m hurdles and indoor 500 m (the mark is also an outright best), and Dutch records in the indoor 200 m and 400 m (out and indoor). In her breakthrough 2021 season, Bol set a Diamond League and three circuit's meet records, and 11 national records with five more as a member of relay teams.  A 'double trouble', she is the strongest part of Dutch 4 x 400 m relays. She is a two-time Diamond League 400 m hurdles champion and also a four-time national champion.

Early life
Femke Bol, born on 23 February 2000 in Amersfoort, trained in judo initially after she broke her arm twice and a doctor recommended the sport for her to learn how to fall. But around age eight she became more interested in cross country running, which her four-year older brother Jeroen started practicing. She followed in his footsteps, joining him when their father was taking him to the woods near Amersfoort. In 2014, Bol transferred from AV Triathlon to AV Altis club, where coach Werner Andrea discovered her talent for longer sprints.

She attended Farel College and, as of 2021, was a student of Communication Sciences at the Wageningen University.

Career

Junior career
Bol focused on the 400 metres distance in 2015, at age 15, and started winning Dutch competitions in her age categories. She won five national youth titles in the 400 m (out- and indoor) between 2015 and 2017, and four junior titles in 2018 and 2019 (400 m out-, indoor and hurdles). Since 2016 she had been training in Arnhem, at Ciko'66 club, where her parents drove her almost daily.

At the international competitions, she progressed steadily. Competing against athletes up to two years her senior, Bol did not advance from the 400 m heats at the 2015 European Youth Olympic Festival in Tbilisi, Georgia. Two years later, the 17-year-old participated in the European Under-20 Championships held in Grosseto, Italy and reached the semi-finals of the event.

In 2019, her last junior year, she won two gold medals at the Dutch U20 championships (400 m indoors and 400 m hurdles), and claimed her first national senior title (indoor 400 m). In June, in the third hurdles race of her life, Bol broke Dutch U20/U23 records and achieved World Championship qualifying standard when winning a meet in Geneva with a time of 55.94 s. In July, she confirmed herself as the continent's best U20 runner in her, since that year, signature event of the 400 m hurdles, with the gold medal at the European U20 Championships in Borås, Sweden. At the Doha World Championships in Qatar in October, the 19-year-old reached the semi-finals with a new personal best of 55.32 s in the heats, becoming the second-fastest European U20 woman in history. She also helped her national women's team place seventh in the 4x400 m relay. Since November 2019, she has been training at the Dutch Olympic Training Centre Papendal near Arnhem, coached by Switzerland's Laurent Meuwly.

Senior career

2020: First senior successes
Bol was forced to train on gravel paths in the woods when COVID-19 quarantine measures were first enacted in March. Despite this, in July she broke by almost a second the national 400 m hurdles record of 54.62 s set by Ester Goossens in 1998, racing in Papendal. First, running in the rain, she took almost a second off her 2019 best with a time of 54.47 s, which could not be ratified as only one other athlete competed. Two weeks later, she achieved 53.79 seconds, the fourth-fastest European under-23 time in history. With this mark, she would have placed fourth at the previous year's World Championships, missing a bronze medal by just five hundredths of a second.

During this pandemic season, the Dutchwoman won all her following races over the barriers: two Diamond League events staged in 2020 as one-off exhibition competitions, and three Continental Tour events. First she ran away from a European-class field in Székesfehérvár, Hungary on 19 August, to repeat this achievement four days later at the Stockholm Bauhaus-galan in winning her first Diamond race. In September, she won in Ostrava (300 m hurdles), Bellinzona, and Rome. She reduced her open 400 metres pre-2020 best by 1.85 s down to 51.13 s.

2021: Tokyo Olympic bronze medallist
In what was very successful season, Bol improved gradually her personal bests, setting 11 national records with five more as a member of relay teams. Bol set also Diamond League record, three circuit's meet records, and five meet records at the World Athletics Indoor Tour and Continental Tour events.

She started her unbeaten indoor campaign on 30 January, smashing her previous best in the 400 metres by more than 1.5 s to break a Dutch record in a time of 50.96 s at the Vienna Indoor Track & Field meet in Austria. Previous record was set a few minutes earlier by Lieke Klaver, who in turn broke the Ester Goossens' mark which had stood at 51.82 s since 1998. Bol then won all her following seven races at the distance in four events, improving in every final. Competing in the World Indoor Tour, she powered to meet records in Metz (50.81) and Toruń (50.66), then clocked 50.64 s at the Dutch Indoor Championships, and finally lowered her record to 50.63 seconds when winning during the European Indoor Championships in Toruń, Poland. She took there her second gold medal anchoring women's 4×400 m relay to a championship record. Her individual mark made her the then-fastest European woman since 2009.

Outdoors the 21-year-old started by competing at the World Athletics Relays to set a 400 m national record of 50.56 s on 29 May at the IFAM meeting in Oordegem. She then started improving her own Dutch hurdling record when winning Diamond League meetings, beginning with a time of 53.44 s on 10 June in Florence. At the time it was also European U23 record, breaking a 37-year-old mark. On 19 June, she reverted back to the one-lap flat event during European Team Championships in Romania and bettered her record with a 50.37 performance. On 1 July in Oslo, she lowered her hurdles record in a time of 53.33 s to further take almost a second off with a Diamond League record of 52.37 s on 4 July in Stockholm, where she beat Shamier Little by 0.02 s. This fast race was only the second in history, after the 2017 USATF Championships, in which three women recorded times below 53 seconds as third-placed Anna Ryzhykova set a Ukrainian record of 52.96. Bol, meanwhile, became the fourth fastest woman of all time with the sixth-fastest result ever, missing the European record by just 0.03 s. On 6 July, she won the event at the Continental Tour meet in Székesfehérvár with a time of 52.81 s, edging out Little in 52.85 s again. Having won Diamond race in Gateshead, England on 13 July, she extended her unbeaten streak in her specialist event to 6 races in the 2021 season and 12 straight races in total. It was her third consecutive victory over the US rival, but this time Bol dominated, running away by about 10 metres.

At the delayed 2020 Tokyo Olympics in July and August 2021, Bol ran six 400 m races with hurdles or flat, including three under 50 seconds relay legs. In what was the speediest women's 400 m hurdles race in history, she bettered an individual Dutch record for the 11th time that year to break the European record, finishing third in a time of 52.03 seconds. She lost only to her main rivals in the world, the Americans, winner Sydney McLaughlin (51.46 – world record) and runner-up Dalilah Muhammad (51.58 – inside previous world record). Bol broke, however, the 2003 Yuliya Pechonkina's European mark of 52.34 s (world record until 2019) and went under the Olympic record that had stood prior to the final, Melaine Walker's 52.64 s from 2008, becoming the third-fastest woman of all time at the event with the fourth-fastest result ever. Her result would have been also a world record about a month earlier, before 27 June, when McLaughlin clocked 51.90 s at the US Olympic trials. It was the first ever Olympic medal for the Netherlands at the event. Before Bol's individual final on 4 August, she helped mixed 4x400m relay team set national record in the final with her 49.74 s split, and later she anchored women's 4x400 relay to consecutive Dutch records in the heat and in the final, clocking splits of 49.14 s and 48.97 s respectively.

After the Games, in August and September, she continued her Diamond League dominance over the barriers, winning Lausanne Athletissima and Zürich Weltklasse final with meet records of 53.05 and 52.80 seconds respectively to claim her first Diamond trophy. In Lausanne she finished clear ahead of Shamier Little and Dalilah Muhammad, while in Zürich Bol held off Little again. Having skipped USA's Prefontaine Classic in Eugene and ran 400m flat at the Meeting de Paris (50.59, 4th), she remained unbeaten in the Diamond race with six wins out of six races. While still in Switzerland, on 14 September, she ended her breakthrough season with yet another meet record at the Galà dei Castelli in Bellinzona, staying unbeaten in 11 from her 12 hurdles races of 2021. The Dutchwoman broke the 53-second barrier four times that season, and was voted European Female Rising Star of the Year.

2022: World silver medallist and triple European champion

Femke Bol opened her indoor season returning to Metz (FR), where she bested her previous meeting record in her specialty distance (50.72), and also won her 200 metres heat with a new PB (23.37). Then she returned in turn to Toruń (PL) to beat her local meet record again (50.64). On 27 February, at the Dutch Indoors, she improved her own national record with a 50.30 seconds clocking which was at the time faster than her outdoor best, and putting her 12th on the world indoor all-time list. Only two-time Olympic champion, Shaunae Miller-Uibo of the Bahamas, had run faster indoors since 2007. At the World Indoor Championships in Belgrade about three weeks later, Bol won the silver medal, after she fell at the finish line during the semi-finals, in a time of 50.57 s behind Miller-Uibo who ran 50.31. Bol also anchored Dutch women's 4x400 m relay to silver thanks to her 'brilliant' closing surge from fourth into second, with the fastest split of the race of 50.26.

The 22-year-old kickstarted her outdoor season on 31 May at the Golden Spike meeting in Ostrava, where she ran a world best over the 300 m hurdles. She clocked a time of 36.86 s, which was 1.3 s faster than the previous best set by Zuzana Hejnova in 2013. She continued her fine form with Diamond Race wins in Rome, Oslo and Stockholm, breaking a meet record in Oslo before posting 52.27 s in Stockholm to improve her own Diamond League record which she set the previous year.

At the World Championships in Eugene, Oregon in July, Bol first ran the final leg of the mixed 4x400 m relay. After taking the baton a distant third, she anchored the Dutch team to a silver and a national record thanks to her split of 48.95 s, the second-fastest female split of the entire race. In her individual event, she equalled her season's best (52.27) to finish behind McLaughlin (who lowered her world record to 50.68 s) and well ahead of Muhammad in third. Dutch women's 4x400 m relay squad lost the baton in the heats and was disqualified despite a qualifying position thanks to Bol's leg. After the championships in August, she broke for the first time the 50-second barrier in the 400 m flat and set a national and meet record with a time of 49.75 s at the Silesia Diamond League.

The same month, she completed the gold hat-trick at the European Championships Munich 2022, becoming the first female sprinter to complete a 400 m double at a major championships as she clearly won one-lap events both with and without hurdles. Her time for the open 400 m of 49.44 s was the fastest at Europeans since Stuttgart 1986 and a new national record, while over the barriers Bol set a championship record. She rounded off her Munich campaign by producing a 48.52 anchor leg to land the Netherlands gold and a national record in the 4x400 m relay, moving from third to first around the final bend; their result was also the fastest since 1986 at the Europeans. Thus Bol became only the second Dutch athlete after Fanny Blankers-Koen in 1950 to win three gold medals at the European Championships.

On her return to the Diamond Race, Bol set yet another meet record over the barriers in Lausanne, and then concluded her third strong season with a decisive victory at the circuit's Zürich final, successfully defending her Diamond League title. She achieved six marks under 53 seconds that year, staying unbeaten in 11 out of her 12 hurdles races, and was crowned European Female Athlete of the Year.

2023: World indoor 400 m record

Bol got her 2023 campaign off to strong start on 4 February as she added next record to her growing CV. She smashed by nearly 0.7 s the world indoor best in the less frequently run distance of 500 metres with 1:05.63, faster also than the outdoor record (65.9), at the New Balance Indoor Grand Prix in Boston, USA. Competing again in Metz (FR), she set new Dutch indoor records in both the 200 m and 400 m. Bol clocked an outright lifetime best in the former (22.87), and broke the 50-second barrier in the latter with 49.96 s as the fourth woman in history and the first woman since 2004 to become the fourth-fastest woman of all time indoors. She next triumphed with a meet record in Liévin (50.20). On 19 February at the Dutch Indoors in Apeldoorn, just four days before her 23rd birthday, she sliced 0.7 s off her best with a landmark 49.26 seconds, obliterating the longest-standing world record in a track race. This was at the time the 49.59 s indoor 400 m record, set by Jarmila Kratochvílová back in 1982. After setting an outright lifetime best, Bol said, "this was almost a perfect race". She rounded off her record-breaking indoor campaign at Istanbul 2023 by defending her European title with the third mark under 50 s that season (49.85), and anchoring the Netherlands to an overwhelming relay victory with a new national and championship record, making them the third-fastest national team in history.

Training for 2023 season saw potentially critical changes to Bol's hurdling technique. She was preparing to do 14 strides between the hurdles for as long as is feasible and to alter with her legs between left and right as her chief rival, McLaughlin-Levrone, already ran with 14 strides until hurdle seven. Tall Bol had run with 15 steps between hurdles before.

Achievements
Information from World Athletics profile unless otherwise noted. Last updated on 5 March 2023.

Personal bests

International competitions

Circuit wins and titles
 Diamond League champion 400 m hurdles (2):  2021,  2022
 400 metres hurdles wins, other events specified in parenthesis
 2020 (2): Stockholm Bauhaus-Galan (54.68), Rome Golden Gala (53.90)
 2021 (6): Rome Golden Gala in Florence (53.44 NR), Oslo Bislett Games (53.33 NR), Stockholm (52.37  NR), Gateshead British Grand Prix (53.24), Lausanne Athletissima (53.05 MR), Zürich Weltklasse (52.80 MR)
 2022 (6): Rome (53.02), Oslo (52.61 MR), Stockholm (52.27 DLR), Chorzów Kamila Skolimowska Memorial (400 m, 49.75 MR NR), Lausanne (52.95 MR), Zürich (53.03)
 World Athletics Continental Tour
 400 metres hurdles wins, other events specified in parenthesis
 2020 [3]: Székesfehérvár Memorial (54.67), Ostrava Golden Spike (300 mH, 38.55 MR), Bellinzona Galà dei Castelli (54.33)
 2021 (3): Hengelo FBK Games (54.33 MR), Székesfehérvár (52.81 MR), Bellinzona (54.01 MR)
 2022 (2): Ostrava (300 mH, 36.86 ), Hengelo (53.94 MR)
 World Athletics Indoor Tour
 400 metres indoors wins, other events specified in parenthesis
 2020 (1): Metz Meeting Moselle Athlelor (Silver level, 52.47)
 2021 (2): Metz (50.81 MR NR), Toruń Copernicus Cup (50.66 MR NR)
 2022 (2): Metz (50.72 MR), Toruń (50.64 MR)
 2023 (4): Boston New Balance Indoor Grand Prix (500 m, 1:05.63 ), Metz (49.96 MR NR) & (200m, 22.87 MR NR), Liévin Meeting Hauts-de-France Pas-de-Calais (50.20 MR)

National championships
Key:
;

Progression
Key:

Dutch athletics age-group outdoor records, indoor records.

Recognition
2021
 European Athletics Female Rising Star of the Year
2022
 European Athletics Female Athlete of the Year
 Royal Dutch Athletics Federation Dutch Athlete of the Year
 NOC*NSF Sport Team of the Year: women's 4 × 400 metres relay athletics (with Eveline Saalberg, Lieke Klaver, Lisanne de Witte, Andrea Bouma and Laura de Witte)

Notes

References

External links

 

2000 births
Living people
Sportspeople from Amersfoort
Dutch female hurdlers
People from Amersfoort
Athletes (track and field) at the 2020 Summer Olympics
Medalists at the 2020 Summer Olympics
Olympic bronze medalists in athletics (track and field)
Olympic bronze medalists for the Netherlands
Olympic athletes of the Netherlands
World Athletics Championships athletes for the Netherlands
European Athletics Indoor Championships winners
Diamond League winners
World Athletics Indoor Championships medalists
21st-century Dutch women
European Athletics Championships winners